John Christopher Draper (March 31, 1835 – December 20, 1885) was an American chemist and surgeon. He was a son of multidisciplinary scientist John William Draper and a brother of astronomer Henry Draper.

Life and work
Draper was born at Christiansville (now Chase City, Virginia). His father, John William Draper, was an accomplished doctor, chemist, astronomer, botanist, and professor at New York University. Draper's mother, Antonia Coetana de Paiva Pereira Gardner, was a daughter of the personal physician to the John VI of Portugal and Charlotte of Spain.

In 1850–52 Draper took the arts course, and in 1855–57 the medical course, in New York University, and then studied in Europe. He was professor of natural sciences (1858–60) and of analytical and practical chemistry (1858–71) in New York University, and in 1859 was one of the first instructors of chemistry at the Cooper Union.

On May 31, 1862, he joined S Company, 12th New York Infantry Regiment as an assistant surgeon along with his brother Henry, who joined as a surgeon. They served until October 8, 1862.

From 1863 to 1885 he was professor of physiology and natural history in the College of the City of New York; in 1865–85, professor of chemistry in the medical department of New York University. In 1873 he received the degree of Doctor of Laws from Trinity College. Draper died suddenly, of pneumonia which he caught during a cold winter. He was serving his duties just a few days before death.

Publications

References

1835 births
1885 deaths
American chemists
People from Chase City, Virginia
Cooper Union faculty
New York University faculty
Trinity Washington University alumni
Deaths from pneumonia in New York City
New York University Grossman School of Medicine alumni
Scientists from Virginia
Union Army surgeons